The American Institute of Aeronautics and Astronautics, Inc. (AIAA) established the Octave Chanute Award named after Octave Chanute. Pilot(s) or test personnel that contributed to the advancement of the art, science, or technology of aeronautics received the Octave Chanute Award. The Octave Chanute Award was renamed the Chanute Flight Award in 1978 and discontinued by the AIAA in 2005. Starting in 2017, the Chanute Flight Award was re-established as the Chanute Flight Test Award. The Chanute Flight Test Award presentation occurs biennially (odd-numbered years) at the AIAA Aviation and Aeronautics Forum.The Chanute Flight Test Award is presented to recognize significant lifetime achievements in the advancement of the art, science, and technology of flight test engineering.

Self taught

Octave Chanute, 1832–1910, was born in France and became a naturalized American. He was a self-taught engineer. He designed the first railroad bridge over the Missouri River and the Union Stock Yards in Chicago (IL) as well as those in Kansas City (MO). Octave Chanute was a pioneer aeronautical engineer and experimenter, and was a friend and adviser to the Wright Brothers.

Aeronautical pioneer
Chanute waged a long campaign to encourage the invention of the airplane. He collected information from every possible source and gave it to anyone who asked. He published a compendium of aviation information in 1894. In 1896 he commissioned several aircraft to be built. The Katydid had multiple wings that could be attached variously about the fuselage for ease of experimentation. Chanute's biplane glider (1896) with "two arched wings held rigidly together by vertical struts and diagonal wire bracing" (the principle of the Pratt truss used in the railroad bridges which Chanute constructed) served as a prototype design for subsequent airplanes.

Chanute Flight Test Award recipients
 1939 Edmund T. Allen, Boeing engineer and test pilot
 1940 Howard Hughes, engineer and test pilot
 1941 Melvin N. Gough, NACA engineer, test pilot
 1942 A. L. MacClain, Pratt & Whitney test pilot
 1943 William H. McAvoy, NACA engineer, test pilot
 1944 Benjamin S. Kelsey, U.S. Army Air Force engineer, test pilot
 1945 Robert T. Lamson, Boeing test pilot
 1945 Albert "Elliot" Merrill, Boeing test pilot
 1946 Captain Ernest A Cutrell, American Airlines test pilot
 1947 Lawrence A. Clousing, NACA engineer and test pilot
 1948 Herbert H. Hoover, NACA test pilot
 1949 Vice Admiral Frederick M. Trapnell, United States Navy pioneering naval aviator and test pilot
 1950 Captain Donald B. MacDiarmid, United States Coast Guard naval aviator
 1951 Major General Marion E. Carl, United States Marine Corps naval aviator and test pilot
 1952 John C. Seal, Cornell Aeronautical Laboratory test pilot
 1953 William B. Bridgeman, Douglas Aircraft Company test pilot
 1954 George E. Cooper, NACA engineer and test pilot
 1955 Major General Albert Boyd, United States Air Force test pilot
 1956 Alvin M. Johnston, Boeing test pilot
 1957 Brigadier General Frank Kendall Everest Jr., United States Air Force test pilot
 1958 Albert Scott Crossfield, North American Aviation engineer and test pilot
 1959 John P. Reeder, NASA, engineer and test pilot
 1960 Dr. Joseph P. Tymczyszyn, Federal Aviation Administration engineer and test pilot
 1961 Joseph A. Walker, NASA engineer and test pilot
 1962 Neil A. Armstrong, NASA engineer and test pilot
 1963 Captain Edward J. Bechtold, Eastern Air Lines pilot
 1964 Robert C. Innis, NASA engineer and test pilot
 1964 Fred J Drinkwater, NASA engineer and test pilot
 1965 Alvin S. White, North American Aviation engineer and test pilot
 1966 John L. Swigert, North American Aviation engineer and test pilot
 1966 Donald F. McCusker, North American Aviation engineer and test pilot
 1967  Milton O. Thompson, NASA, engineer and test pilot
 1968 Colonel William J. Knight, United States Air Force engineer and test pilot
 1969 William C. Park, Lockheed test pilot
 1970 Colonel Jerauld R. Gentry United States Air Force engineer and test pilot
 1971 William M. Magruder, Federal Aviation Administration program manager, engineer, and test pilot
 1972 Donald R. Segner, Lockheed engineer and test pilot
 1973 Major General Cecil W. Powell, United States Air Force engineer and test pilot
 1974 Lt. Colonel Charles A. Sewell, Grumman engineer and test pilot
 1975 Captain Alan L. Bean, NASA, engineer and astronaut
 1975 Colonel Jack R. Lousma, NASA, engineer and astronaut
 1975 Dr. Owen K. Garriott, NASA, engineer and astronaut
 1976 Lt. General Thomas P. Stafford, United States Air Force engineer and astronaut
 1978 Tommie D. Benefield, North American Rockwell engineer and test pilot
 1979 Colonel Austin J. Bailey
 1981 Raymond L. McPherson, Boeing test pilot
 1983 S. L Wallick, Jr., Boeing engineer and test pilot
 1986 George R. Jansen, Douglas Aircraft Company test pilot.
 1988 Russell C. Larson, NASA engineer and pilot
 1990 William G Schweikhard, University of Kansas
 1992 Robert A. Hoover, Evergreen International test pilot
 1994 Richard Abrams, Lockheed executive
 1996 Edward T Schneider, NASA, engineer and test pilot
 1998 Harold C Farley, Lockheed, engineer and test pilot
 2002 Mike Carriker, Boeing engineer and test pilot
 2017 William R. Gray, United States Air Force engineer and test pilot
 2019 David W. Minto
 2022 Rogers E. Smith, SR-71 Pilot and Test Pilot

See also

 List of aviation awards
 History of aviation#Picking up the pace

References

External links
Western Society of Engineers
Octave Chanute—A champion of aviation
 Locomotive to Aeromotive – Octave Chanute and the Transportation Revolution, by Simine Short. University of Illinois Press (August 2011)

Aviation awards
Award